Sesan Adedeji (born 23 October 1996) is a Nigerian cricketer. He played in the 2016 ICC World Cricket League Division Five tournament. In September 2018, he was named in Nigeria's squad for the 2018 Africa T20 Cup. He made his Twenty20 debut for Nigeria in the 2018 Africa T20 Cup on 15 September 2018. In October 2019, he was named in Nigeria's squad for the 2019 ICC T20 World Cup Qualifier tournament in the United Arab Emirates. He made his Twenty20 International (T20I) debut for Nigeria, against Jersey, on 19 October 2019.

In October 2021, he was named in Nigeria's squad for the Regional Final of the 2021 ICC Men's T20 World Cup Africa Qualifier tournament in Rwanda.

References

External links
 

1996 births
Living people
Nigerian cricketers
Nigeria Twenty20 International cricketers
Sportspeople from Abeokuta
21st-century Nigerian people